NGC 2266 is an open cluster in the constellation Gemini. Its apparent size is 5 arc minutes. It was discovered by German-British astronomer William Herschel on 7 December 1785.

References

External links

2266
Open clusters
Gemini (constellation)
1785